was a politician and cabinet minister in early Shōwa period Japan. His brother, Zenbei Horikiri was also a politician and prominent member of the Rikken Seiyūkai political party.

Biography
Horikiri was born in Fukushima Prefecture. After his graduation from Tokyo Imperial University, he entered the Home Ministry. As Director of the Censorship Department within the Home Ministry from 1917 to 1918, he ordered that publication of articles in newspapers concerning the Rice Riots of 1918 be banned, as they appears to be inciting violence.  From 1925 to 1926, Horikiri was governor of Kanagawa Prefecture. The following year, he returned to the Home Ministry as Director of the Reconstruction Bureau, which was in charge of urban planning and the rebuilding of Tokyo in the aftermath of the Great Kantō earthquake. In 1929, Horikiri was appointed Mayor of Tokyo City, and at the end of 1930 was Vice Minister of the Ministry of Colonial Affairs.

In 1932, in the administration of Prime Minister Saitō Makoto, Horikiri served as Director-General of the Cabinet Legislation Bureau, and in 1933 was appointed Chief Cabinet Secretary. The same year, he was appointed to a seat in the upper house of the Diet of Japan.

Following the surrender of Japan, Horikiri was appointed Home Minister under the Shidehara administration. During his tenure, he sponsored election reform laws to lower the minimum voting age to twenty, and to enable were enacted on women’s suffrage and eligibility for seats on in the Diet. The laws were passed in the Diet in December 1945, despite reservations by some members that this action would lend support to extremist (particularly leftist) elements. As a result of the election law reforms, Koreans and Taiwanese resident in Japan lost their rights to vote in Japanese elections, as Horikiri judged that they had lost their Japanese nationality with Japan’s acceptance of the Potsdam Declaration, and would thenceforth need to be treated as resident foreigners.

At the end of his term of office, Horikiri was placed on purged list of those banned from holding government office.

Following the end of the occupation, Horikiri served from 1954 to 1969 as the Chairman of the National Public Safety Commission.

References
 Kornicki, Peter F.  Meiji Japan. Routledge (1998). 
Kono,Masaru.  Japan’s Postwar Party Politics. Princeton University Press. (1997) 
Hunter, Janet.  A Concise Dictionary of Modern Japanese History ''. University of California Press (1994).

Notes

1884 births
1974 deaths
Politicians from Fukushima Prefecture
University of Tokyo alumni
Government ministers of Japan
Ministers of Home Affairs of Japan
Members of the House of Peers (Japan)
Governors of Kanagawa Prefecture